Aepa Khan (Persian: ايوب خان, Tatar: Äyyüb , Russian: Аепа (Ayepa)) (died 1117) was a ruler of the Kipchak commonwealth. He was a grandfather of Andrew the Pious. There is some information about his war against Vladimir Monomach. Later, Kipchakia, still ruled by Ayepa, also attacked Volga Bulgaria in union with the Kievan Rus.

Etymology
Aepa may be a slavicization of the Arab name Ayyub. A recent and more accepted theory reconstructs it to Ayoba or Ayapa (moon-father).

References

12th-century Kipchacks
Turkic rulers
12th-century rulers in Asia
11th-century births
1117 deaths
Year of birth unknown

ko:아유브 칸